The African Governance Architecture (AGA) is a mechanism for dialogue between stakeholders that are mandated to promote good governance and bolster democracy in Africa. In the book entitled The African Union Law (Ed. Berger Levrault, 2014, p. 29) Blaise Tchikaya established the link between conceptual platform called AGA and the modernisation of International Law applicable to African states. The AGA is fundamentally one aspect – probably the most significant – of recent international law of governance. Furthermore, it is a key actor in promoting the domestication and implementation of the objectives outlined in the legal and policy pronouncements in the African Union (AU) Shared Values. Established in 2011 AGA is based in Addis Ababa, Ethiopia in the AU Headquarters with the AGA Platform Members based Africa wide. In February 2016 the rules of Procedure on how the AGA legally functions were adopted by Member States during the African Union Summit.

History 
The discussion of a “Pan-african Architecture on Governance” began with the 16th Ordinary Session of the African Assembly which focused on the theme of the Shared Values of the AU. This Session was held in Addis Ababa, Ethiopia, in 2011 and adopted a mandate that would establish a "Pan-African Architecture on Governance". In order to give effect to the Assembly decision on the Establishment of the Pan-African Governance Architecture, the African Union Commission (AUC) established the African Governance Architecture (AGA) as a platform that promotes interactions between stakeholders who work on promoting good governance and strengthening democracy in Africa, in addition to translating the objectives of the legal and policy pronouncements in the AU Shared Values (see below for more information).

With 2012 being the year of AU Shared Values the diverse charters of the AU were pushed to becoming an integral guide to the activities to both the Organs and Member States of the African Union. As a result, the African Charter for Democracy, Elections and Governance (ACDEG), an integral document stipulating the functions of the AGA, was put into force after being adopted in 2007.

On the 14 of June the AGA Platform was established in Lusaka, Zambia in order to create a space within the AGA structure where the diverse stakeholders and organs of the AU working in the field of Democracy, Elections and Governance work together to implement and domesticate the AU Shared Values.

In 2013 both the Platform and Secretariat became operational and finally for the 26th ordinary Session of the AU assembly (Jan 2016) the Rules of Procedure were legally adopted giving the AGA a legal guide on its activities.

Goals and Purpose/Mandate

Goal 

The overall goal of the AGA is to strengthen good governance and consolidate democracy in Africa.

Objectives 
Source:

 Accelerate the ratification, domestication, implementation and monitoring of African Shared values instrument

 Deepen synergy, coordination, cooperation and harmonization of shared values instruments among AU organs, institutions and RECs on democracy, governance, human rights and humanitarian affairs.

 Enhance the capacity of AU organs, institutions and RECs to support Member States to strengthen governance and consolidate democracy through implementation of shared values agenda

 Enhance popular participation and citizen engagement in attainment of democracy, governance and respect for human and peoples’ rights

 Coordinate evaluation and reporting on implementation and compliance with AU norms on governance and democracy as envisaged by article 44, 45 and 49 of the ACDEG.

 Foster dialogue and share comparable lessons on trends, challenges, opportunities and prospects for improving governance and democracy among Member States

 Generate, manage and disseminate knowledge on African shared values agenda, good governance and democracy in Africa.

 Facilitate joint engagement and deepen synergy with the African Peace and Security Architecture (APSA) in strategic interventions: preventive diplomacy, conflict prevention and post-conflict, reconstruction and development in Africa.

AGA Structure 

Four interrelated components make up the structure of AGA:

Norms & Standards 
Source:

The AGA is structured around a normative framework that is set up by the African Union Shared Values. AGA is based on objectives and principles that have been defined in the various AU Shared Values instruments that AU Member States have signed and ratified and thus committed to, including but not limited to the following:

AGA Platform
Sources:

The AGA Platform consists of institutions and AU Organs with a formal mandate on governance, democracy, human rights, elections and humanitarian assistance. The Platform envisions to harmonize the shared instruments and coordinate joint initiatives in governance and democracy. The members are:

The Clusters and Secretariat 
The AGA Platform is technically assisted by the AGA Secretariat and the Clusters within AGA. They are both the mechanisms for interaction and foster the engagement of the AGA Platform Members.

Clusters 
Source:

The Clusters were established as coordinating arms to support and achieve the goals of AGA. There are five clusters focusing on the different fields that AGA is involved in. These are:

Secretariat 
Source:
The AGA Secretariat as mentioned is the coordinating hub of the AGA Platform. It is housed in the Department of Political Affairs of the African Union Commission (AUC) and is responsible for collating and processing the Platform outcomes for presentation to, and consideration by AU Policy Organs.

African Governance Facility
Source:

The African Governance Facility (APF) is the resource mobilization framework of AGA designed to support Platform Members’ initiatives and programs which promote good governance and democracy on the continent. The facility aims to especially promote:
"institutional capacity strengthening and building; dialogues to facilitate citizen engagement in democratic governance processes; technical support to Member States towards the ratification, domestication, implementation and reporting on AU Shared Values instruments; and preventive diplomacy, post conflict reconstruction and peacebuilding initiatives".

Activities 

The activities are divided between the activities of the AGA secretariat that are meant to coordinate the implementation and activities of the AGA platform members and secondly the activities of the AGA platform members.

The AGA Secretariat activities are as follows:

Youth Engagement Strategy 
The AGA Youth Engagement Strategy was set up to promote the effective participation of Africa's youths in democratic governance initiatives of the AGA platform especially with a focus on democracy, elections, human rights and governance in Africa. With Africa having the youngest population on earth the Youth Strategy thus sees this as an area of focus for increasing the engagement with civil society.

The Strategy especially suggests to develop a continental youth mentorship program, setup Model AUs working closely with higher learning institutions in Africa and making space for AU "youth ambassador" positions.

High level Dialogue 
Sources:

This Dialogue occurred for the fourth time in December 2015. It was set up to create an annual event where AGA Platform members, member states and non-state actors frankly account and analyze the impact of their work towards consolidating democracy and bolstering good governance in Africa. In order to further align with the previously mentioned Youth Engagement Strategy, AGA has also introduced a youth pre-forum that aims to bolster the involvement of youths in High Level meetings. The topics of the last four High Level Dialogues were:

 November 2012 in Dakar, Senegal, on the state of democratic governance in Africa
 November, 2013 in Dakar, Senegal, and focused on enhancing constitutionalism and rule of law in Africa
 October 2014 in Dakar, Senegal, on the theme silencing the guns: strengthening governance in resolving conflicts in Africa.
 December 2015 in Kigali, Rwanda reviewed and addressed the state of women's equal participation and leadership in political parties in Africa (with a Youth Pre-forum).

Knowledge Management Strategy
Source:

Currently the AGA is working on a unified Knowledge Management Strategy that envisions to create a unified strategy to compile, produce and disseminate knowledge products on the Platform members. The exact content of the strategy is yet to be announced and verified by external sources.

Furthermore, the Platform Members work actively in ensuring joint programming a few examples are:

The African Commission working together with the African Court and the African Charter on the Rights and Welfare of the Child on a joint inquiry mission in South Sudan resulting in a 315-page document highlighting the Human Rights violations on the basis on which extensive recommendations were set forward.

State Reporting guidelines as legislated in the ACDEG and finalized with the adoption of the rules of procedure obligate countries to submit a State Report every 2 years. To date none have been submitted. The State Reporting Process and Mechanism gives rise to large scale interaction between all AGA Platform Members especially as members such as the Commission or APRM have existing State reporting mechanisms that can be utilized and thus create synergies within the mandate of AGA.

AGA Synergies 
Source:

Due to the nature of the AGA there are many overlapping areas with other organs and structures within the African Union. As it is a coordinating body much like the African Peace and Security Architecture (APSA) they complement each other in that they both acknowledge that democratic governance and Peace and Security are interrelated and are reinforcing factors required to achieve both. Thus AGA and APSA are working on mutually reinforcing projects through structure such as the Inter- Departmental Task Force on Conflict Prevention (IDTFCP)

Critics have noted that this looks good on paper but little has become operational within this synergy. The weak linkages need to be strengthened to become mutually beneficial

Achievements 

 joint Election Observation Missions between AGA Platform Members
 Adopted Rules of Procedure that legally define the mandate of AGA.
 The Launch of Project 2016- "African Year of Human Rights with a particular focus on the Rights of Women"
 4 High Level Dialogues that resulted in further consolidation between AGA Platform Members, Civil Society Organizations, Member States and Youths.

Challenges and criticism 
The main challenges that have been identified by various think tanks and external Evaluations are:

 "The AGA and APSA do not yet have strong institutional connections" 
 "The Constitutive Act of the AU only makes reference to ‘good governance’ and not ‘governance’. The conspicuous absence of the fundamental concept of good governance, which is entrenched in the Constitutive Act, will render the AGA ineffective since ‘governance’ as a concept does not necessarily advance the objective of the AU of promoting good governance."
 The AU Commission, which is the heart of AGA lacks clear organizational structures and thus is not ideal to spearhead the initiative.
 AGA needs to establish a sustainable funding scheme that will ensure independent and well functioning structures.
 The collaborative work between AGA and its Platform Members are still unclear especially with actors such as APRM.

See also 
 Pan African Parliament
 African Commission on Human and Peoples' Rights
 African Court on Human and Peoples' Rights
 African Peer Review Mechanism
 African Charter on Human and Peoples' Rights
 ECOSOCC
 NEPAD
 RECs
 ACERWC
 African Union Commission
 African Union

References

External links 
 AGA Framework Document

African Union
Governance
Intergovernmental organizations established by treaty
Organisations based in Addis Ababa
Pan-African organizations